The 2016–17 Copa del Rey was the 115th staging of the Copa del Rey (including two seasons where two rival editions were played).

Barcelona were the two-time defending champions, and successfully defended their title following a 3–1 win over Alavés in the final.

As winners, Barcelona would have been assured a place for the 2017–18 UEFA Europa League group stage; however, since they already qualified for the Champions League by finishing 2nd in La Liga, the berth was instead passed down the league. Times up to 29 October 2016 and from 26 March 2017 are CEST (UTC+2). Times from 30 October 2016 to 25 March 2017 are CET (UTC+1).

Schedule and format

Notes
Double-match rounds enforced the away goals rule, single-match rounds did not.
Games ending in a tie were decided in extra time, and if still level, by a penalty shoot-out.

Qualified teams
The following teams qualified for the competition. Reserve teams were excluded.

First round
The draw for the first and the second round was held on 22 July 2016 at 13:00 CEST in La Ciudad del Fútbol, RFEF headquarters, in Las Rozas, Madrid. In this round, 33 teams from the 2016–17 Segunda División B and nine from the 2016–17 Tercera División teams gained entry. In the draw, firstly six teams from Segunda División B received a bye and then, the remaining teams this league and teams from Tercera División faced according to proximity criteria by next groups:

Alcoyano, Arenas, Cartagena, Llagostera, Racing Santander and Tudelano received a bye to the second round.

Second round
In the second round teams from Segunda División played among themselves and teams from Segunda División B and Tercera played separately. Córdoba received a bye to the third round.

Third round
The third round was played in a similar format to the second one. Huesca received a bye to the round of 32.

Final phase 

The draw for the Round of 32 was held on 14 October 2016, in La Ciudad del Fútbol. In this round, all La Liga teams entered the competition.

Round of 32 pairings were as follows: the six remaining teams participating in the 2016–17 Segunda División B and Tercera División faced the 2016–17 La Liga teams which qualified for European competitions. The six remaining teams participating in Segunda División faced five La Liga teams which did not qualify for European competitions and the remaining Europa League team from the pot 2 that was not faced with any team from the pot 1. The remaining eight La Liga teams faced each other. In matches involving teams from different league tiers, the team in the lower tier played the first leg at home. This rule will also be applied in the Round of 16, but not for the Quarter-finals and Semi-finals, in which the order of legs will be based on the luck of the draw.

Bracket

Round of 32

|}

First leg

Second leg

Round of 16

 

|}

First leg

Second leg

Quarter-finals

|}

First leg

Second leg

Semi-finals
The draw for the semi-finals and final was held on 27 January 2017.

|}

First leg

Second leg

Final

The draw for the final was held on 27 January 2017.

Top goalscorers

Notes

References

External links

Royal Spanish Football Federation website 
Copa del Rey at LFP website 

2016–17
1